Diphosphoinositol polyphosphate phosphohydrolase 2 is an enzyme that in humans is encoded by the NUDT4 gene.

The protein encoded by this gene regulates the turnover of diphosphoinositol polyphosphates. The turnover of these high-energy diphosphoinositol polyphosphates represents a molecular switching activity with important regulatory consequences. Molecular switching by diphosphoinositol polyphosphates may contribute to regulating intracellular trafficking. Several alternatively spliced transcript variants have been described, but the full-length nature of some variants has not been determined. Isoforms DIPP2alpha and DIPP2beta are distinguishable from each other solely by DIPP2beta possessing one additional amino acid due to intron boundary skidding in alternate splicing.

References

Further reading

Nudix hydrolases